Sir Richard Ottley (1782–1845) was the fifth Chief Justice of the Supreme Court of Judicature of Ceylon.

He was the son of Drewry Ottley of St Vincent in the West Indies, and was married to 2nd baronet William Young's daughter, Sarah Elizabeth. He owned two slaves that had been left to him as a legacy of his grandmother, Mrs Jackson.

In 1814 he was appointed Chief Justice of Grenada. He sailed to Ceylon in 1820 to take up the position of judge after having been knighted (22 March 1820)  and was promoted to Chief Justice of Ceylon on 1 November 1827, succeeding Ambrose Hardinge Giffard. He held that position until 1833, when he was succeeded by Charles Marshall.

He resided at 50 York Street, Portman Square in London after retiring his judgeship. On his death he was survived by his four children, but left provision in his will to support Grace Furness of Grenada, who may have been a fifth.

References

Chief Justices of British Ceylon
1782 births
1845 deaths
19th-century Sri Lankan people
Sri Lankan people of British descent
British expatriates in Sri Lanka
19th-century British people
Puisne Justices of the Supreme Court of Ceylon
British Ceylon judges